Darfur Now is a 2007 documentary film examining the genocide in Darfur. It was written and directed by Ted Braun and produced by Don Cheadle,  Mark Jonathan Harris and Cathy Schulman. Executive Producers included Jeffrey Skoll, Omar Amanat, Dean Schramm, Diane Weyermann, and Matt Palmieri. The film is a call to action for people all over the world to help the ongoing crisis in Darfur.

Darfur Now premiered at the 2007 Toronto International Film Festival. The film was released in the United States and Canada on November 2, 2007.

Summary
Darfur Now follows the story of six individuals, who are tied together by the same cause: the crisis in Darfur. These individuals include Don Cheadle, an Oscar-nominated actor using his celebrity status to draw attention to the issue, as well as Adam Sterling, a 24-year-old waiter and activist urging Governor Arnold Schwarzenegger to sign a bill to keep California funds from investing in companies with interests in Sudan, and Luis Moreno-Ocampo, the Prosecutor of the International Criminal Court in The Hague, Netherlands. Then there's the ones actually situated in Darfur: Hejewa Adam, a woman whose baby was beaten to death by Janjaweed attackers who now fights in the Sudanese Liberation Army; Ahmed Mohammed Abakar, a displaced builder and farmer who now serves as leader and head sheikh of a camp of 47,000 other displaced Darfurians; and Pablo Recalde, leader of the World Food Program in West Darfur.

See also
Eyes and Ears Of God – Video surveillance of Sudan, a 2012 documentary film
Nuba Conversations, a 2000 documentary film
Sri Lanka's Killing Fields, a 2011 documentary film
War in Darfur

References

External links
 Darfur Now at MySpace
 
 
 
 
 

2007 films
American documentary films
Documentary films alleging war crimes
Documentary films about the War in Darfur
2007 documentary films
Documentary films about refugees
Participant (company) films
Films scored by Graeme Revell
2000s English-language films
2000s American films